Where the Women Wear the Glory and the Men Wear the Pants is the second studio album by post-punk band Death of Samantha, released in 1988 on Homestead Records.

Release and reception 

Glenn Kenny of Trouser Press praised the album, saying it "rocks out with fire, anger and intelligence"

Track listing

Personnel 
Adapted from the Where the Women Wear the Glory and the Men Wear the Pants liner notes.

Death of Samantha
 Doug Gillard – guitar, backing vocals, musical arrangement
 John Petkovic – lead vocals
 Steve-O – drums, backing vocal
 Dave Swanson – bass guitar, backing vocal

Additional musicians and production
 Chris Burgess – production, recording
 Death of Samantha – production, percussion
 Tom Fallon – maracas (5)
 Scott Savage – saxophone (6)
 Frank Vale – horns
 Ivan Vuckcevich – piano (1)

Release history

References

External links 
 

1988 albums
Death of Samantha albums
Homestead Records albums